Mundare is a town in central Alberta, Canada. The Canadian National Railway tracks run through the town.

History 

Mundare was named after William Mundare, a railway station agent. In July 2007, the town marked its 100th anniversary with a three-day celebration.

Demographics 

In the 2016 Census of Population conducted by Statistics Canada, the Town of Mundare recorded a population of 852 living in 359 of its 390 total private dwellings, a  change from its 2011 population of 855.

Attractions 

Mundare is host to The Basilian Father's Museum that presents the history of the Ukrainian settlement and Basilian Father's Mission in east-central Alberta.  It holds a unique collection of 16th and 17th century liturgical books from Ukraine.  The museum is off of the highway 855 that borders the eastern part of town and is across from the "Grotto" called the "Golgotha of Mundare", an elegant garden and shrine that was built by the Basilian Fathers in 1934.

It is also home of the world's largest garlic sausage (kielbasa or kovbasa), which cost about $120,000 to build and erect.

Notable people 
Albert Bandura, psychologist
Evelyn Roth, artist

See also 
List of communities in Alberta
List of towns in Alberta

References

External links 

1907 establishments in Alberta
Towns in Alberta